= Anura Rambukkana =

Professor Anura Rambukkana is head of the Anura Rambukkana Research Group at the University of Edinburgh's Centre for Regenerative Medicine. He is a specialist in research into the causes of leprosy.
